Mill Creek is a stream in the U.S. state of Georgia. It is a tributary to Muckalee Creek.

Mill Creek was so named for a watermill on its course.

References

Rivers of Georgia (U.S. state)
Rivers of Sumter County, Georgia